Somatina purpurascens is a moth of the family Geometridae first described by Frederic Moore in 1887. It is found in Sri Lanka.

Description
The  wingspan is about 34 mm in the male and 36 mm in the female. The antennae of the male are finely ciliated. Hindleg of male small. Tibia dilated with a fold and large tuft of long hair. It is a whitish moth with slight rufous and fuscous suffusion. Head blackish. Forewings with rusty costa. A medial sinuous line present, which is angled below costa, with another line beyond it produced to points beyond the angles of cell and approaching the medial line below the cell, the area between them usually tinged with rufous and with a cell-spot. There is a sub-marginal waved line produced to a point below costa, then usually obsolescent, the area beyond it rufous as far as the marginal rufous band of triangular marks, which does not extend to the costa. Hindwings with cell-speck and traces of waved medial and postmedial line. The outer area fuscous, with marginal series of triangular rufous marks.

References

Moths described in 1887
Scopulini